Jack "Jock" Lorimer (1883–1920) was a popular music hall entertainer.  Originally from Forres in Scotland, he performed as "The Hielan' Laddie" with success in London and on tour in the United States.  His son was the famous comedian Max Wall.

References

1883 births
1920 deaths
Music hall performers
Eccentric dancers